This is a list of holidays in Mozambique

This is a list of City-specific holidays in Mozambique

References

Mozambican culture
Events in Mozambique
Mozambique
Mozambique